Walter Webster may refer to:

 Walter Ernest Webster (1877–1959), British figure and portrait painter
 Wally Webster (1895–1980), footballer, played for Walsall, Lincoln City, Sheffield United, Torquay United, Rochdale and Barrow
 Walter Webster (footballer, born 1906) (1906–1942), played for Rochdale, Sheffield Wednesday, Oswestry and Guildford